The 2019 W Series Misano round (also commercially referred to as #WRace3) was the third round of the 2019 W Series, and took place at the Misano World Circuit in Italy on 8 June 2019. The event was an undercard to the 2019 Deutsche Tourenwagen Masters round at the same circuit.

Report

Background
Following a first and a second placing in the opening two races, Jamie Chadwick leads the series on 43 points – six points ahead of Zolder race winner Beitske Visser. Having scored podiums in both of the races so far, Alice Powell sits third in the standings some 10 points behind fellow Briton Chadwick.

Finnish driver Emma Kimiläinen will once again be ruled out of racing following her injury sustained in a crash at Hockenheim. Both reserve drivers Sarah Bovy and Vivien Keszthelyi will replace her.

Practice
Both practice sessions were held in hot, dry conditions. Free Practice One would be led by Beitske Visser, with Alice Powell just over a tenth behind her. Jessica Hawkins would be a surprise third with championship leader Chadwick down in 4th. The top 12 cars would be covered by less than a second, including reserve driver Vivien Keszthelyi.

Practice Two would be delayed by 50 minutes due to track maintenance. Japanese driver Miki Koyama would set the fastest time of the day with a 1:34.663, roughly 0.15sec ahead of Chadwick. Hawkins would continue the strong showing again in third, with local driver Vittoria Piria in fourth but only three-hundredths quicker than Visser – the top five covered by less than four-tenths of a second.

Qualifying
Qualifying began with Jamie Chadwick setting the pace, before quickly being deposed by Beitske Visser. Halfway through the session, Fabienne Wohlwend – one of the few drivers with circuit experience having won races at Misano in the Ferrari Challenge – skipped half a second clear. Caitlin Wood took too many liberties with the track limits soon after, breaking her suspension on a kerb. Sarah Bovy also had her fastest time deleted for not respecting track limits. Chadwick got within four-hundredths of the pole position, however Wohlwend had done enough to become only the second Liechtensteiner to sit on the pole position of an FIA-sanctioned open-wheel race, and first since Rikky von Opel at the Castle Combe round of the 1971 British Formula 3 Championship.

Race
Wohlwend made a terrible start from pole position, allowing Chadwick to move past on the run to turn one. Visser and Powell pulled alongside Wohlwend, however in Powell's attempts to push Wohlwend into giving up the place she ran out of road and made wheel-to-wheel contact with the Liechtensteiner, launching onto two wheels and coming to a rest in the gravel trap with broken front-left suspension, necessitating the deployment of the Safety Car.

At the restart, Chadwick led Visser and Wohlwend. The top three started to pull away from the battle for fourth between Vittoria Piria and Miki Koyama. Wohlwend began to search for a way past Visser, however ran wide at the final corner and lost a second on the Dutchwoman, allowing the #95 to pressure Chadwick. Around half-way through the race, Koyama passed Piria at the exit of Turn 8 as the local driver mis-shifted.

Further back, Sarah Moore formed a midfield train from eighth place back. Esmee Hawkey went wide exiting Turn 14 and dropped outside of the top ten, with Naomi Schiff the beneficiary. The joy would be short-lived for the German/Rwandan driver, who spun the car exiting Turn 5 and dropped down to last place. Sabré Cook managed to pass Moore for 8th on the penultimate lap.

At the front, Wohlwend in third dropped back in an effort to conserve the tyres on the hot Misano circuit, before settling for the final spot on the podium. The championship leaders Visser and Chadwick pushed each other to the flag, and it would be the Briton who came out on top and with her second W Series victory. Visser claimed second with the fastest lap and Wohlwend scored a maiden podium in third. Koyama led home Piria in fourth, with Marta García sixth and Tasmin Pepper seventh in a quiet race for the pair. Cook finished ahead of the midfield battle in eighth, with Moore ninth and reserve driver Vivien Keszthelyi scoring the final point in tenth.

Classification

Practice

Qualifying

 Hawkey was given a 5-place grid penalty for causing a collision in the previous race.

Race

 Hawkins was given a 5-second time penalty for not adhering to track limits.

Championship standings

See also
 2019 DTM Misano round

References

External links
Official website

|- style="text-align:center"
|width="35%"|Previous race:
|width="30%"|W Series2019 season
|width="40%"|Next race:

Misano W Series
W Series Misano
Misano
W Series Misano